Hoops is an American animated sitcom created by Ben Hoffman for Netflix that premiered on August 21, 2020. In December 2020, Netflix cancelled the series after one season.

Premise
Hoops follows Ben Hopkins, "a hot-headed, foul-mouthed high school basketball coach who thinks turning around his God-awful team will take him to the 'big leagues' and turn his miserable life around."

Cast and characters

Main
 Jake Johnson as Coach Ben Hopkins, a rude and bad-tempered basketball coach at Lenwood High School. He is Shannon's ex-husband, Ron's best friend and Barry's estranged son. Ben's main goal is to turn his team's poor reputation around, but his attempts to do this often end in disaster and failure (with the exception of the episode "The Sponsor", in which he encourages each member of the team to treat the competition like their respective father, which leads to a rare victory for Ben's team). Aside from basketball, Ben wants to rekindle his relationship with Shannon, and is also obsessed with the 1991 film Little Man Tate. 
 Ron Funches as Ron, Lenwood High's assistant basketball coach and Ben's best friend who is dating Ben's estranged wife.
 Cleo King as Opal Lowry, the principal at Lenwood High and Ben's boss.
 Natasha Leggero as Shannon, Ben's estranged wife.
 A. D. Miles as Matty Atkins, a seven-foot-tall 16-year-old who is on Lenwood High's basketball team.
 Rob Riggle as Barry Hopkins, a legendary former basketball player who is now the owner of Hopkins Steakhouse and Ben's father.

Recurring
 Nick Swardson as Scott, a gay teenager who plays on Lenwood High's basketball team 
 Sam Richardson as Marcus, the only African-American player on the basketball team. He is often the team's voice of reason.
 Ben Hoffman as Time Bomb, a redneck player on the basketball team who is implied to be from an inbred family. 
 Eric Edelstein as Kirk, one of Ben's friends.
 Mary Holland as Connie, a prostitute whom Ben knows.
 Gil Ozeri as Isaac, a Jewish player on the basketball team.
 Steve Berg as DJ, an overweight player on the basketball team. He wears goggles with orange lenses while playing and speaks with a lisp.
 Max Greenfield as Lonnie Seymour, an ethics teacher at Lenwood, who dislikes Ben.

Guests
 Guy Fieri as himself
 Damon Wayans Jr. as Damian Chapman
 Hannah Simone as Dr. Brooks
 Will Forte as Dawa, an anger management therapist who is a Zen master. In "Zen", he helps Ben to control his temper and reduce his arrogance, only for the former to reappear later in the episode when Ben sees three gay students harassing Scott for apparently being straight, and the latter in the following episode.

Episodes

Production
On October 3, 2018, it was announced that Netflix had given the production a series order for a first season consisting of ten episodes. The series was created by Ben Hoffman who was also expected to executive produce alongside Phil Lord, Christopher Miller, Seth Cohen, M. Dickson and Jake Johnson. Production companies involved with the series were slated to be Bento Box Entertainment and 20th Television. Alongside the series order announcement, it was confirmed that Jake Johnson was set to star in the series. In July 2020, it was announced that Natasha Leggero, Rob Riggle, Ron Funches, Cleo King and A. D. Miles were cast in starring roles. The series premiered on August 21, 2020. The official series trailer was released on August 6, 2020. On December 8, 2020, Netflix canceled the series after one season.

Reception

Hoops received negative reviews from critics. The review aggregator website Rotten Tomatoes gives it an approval rating of 14% based on 14 reviews, with an average rating of 3.71/10. The website's critics consensus reads, "Crude, rude, and aimless, Hoops first season throws nothing but bricks." Metacritic, another aggregation site, gives it a weighted average score of 35 out of 100 based on 9 reviews, indicating "generally unfavorable reviews".

Caroline Framke of Variety described the series "isn't half the joke machine it would need to be in order to justify its total lack of nuance". Stuart Jeffries of The Guardian described it as a "puerile comedy ... perfect for Trump's America" that is more "toxically retrograde" than Love Thy Neighbour, noting its sexualized portrayal of women, an overabundance of penis jokes, and a cast of mostly stereotypical token characters.

References

External links

2020 American television series debuts
2020 American television series endings
2020s American adult animated television series
2020s American high school television series
2020s American sitcoms
American adult animated comedy television series
American animated sitcoms
American adult animated sports television series
American flash adult animated television series
Basketball television series
English-language Netflix original programming
Television series about educators
Television series by 20th Century Fox Television
Television series by Fox Television Animation
Television shows set in Kentucky